The 15651 / 52 Guwahati–Jammu Tawi Lohit Express is an Express train belonging to Indian Railways – Northeast Frontier Railway zone that runs between  &  in India.

It operates as train number 15651 from Guwahati to Jammu Tawi and as train number 15652 in the reverse direction, serving the 8 states of Assam, West Bengal, Bihar, Uttar Pradesh, Uttarakhand, Haryana, Punjab and Jammu and Kashmir.

It is named after the Lohit River which flows through the Indian states of Arunachal Pradesh and Assam and is 1 of 3 trains that connect Guwahati and Jammu Tawi, the other being the Amarnath Express and Kamakhya–Shri Mata Vaishno Devi Katra Express.

Coaches

The 15651 / 52 Guwahati–Jammu Tawi Lohit Express has 1 AC 2 tier, 2 AC 3 tier, 14 Sleeper class, 4 General Unreserved & 2 SLR (Seating cum Luggage Rake) coaches. In addition, it carries a pantry car and some High Capacity Parcel Vans .
 
As is customary with most train services in India, coach composition may be amended at the discretion of Indian Railways depending on demand.

Service

As the average speed of the train is below , as per Indian Railways rules, its fare does not include a Superfast surcharge.

Routeing

The 15651 / 52 Guwahati–Jammu Tawi Lohit Express runs through the following stations:

ASSAM
 (Starts)

WEST BENGAL

New Jalpaiguri (Siliguri)

BIHAR

Begusarai

Mehnar road

UTTAR PRADESH
Bhatni

Lucknow NR
Hardoi

HARYANA

Yamunanagar Jagadhri

UTTARAKHAND
Laksar Junction

PUNJAB
 

JAMMU KASHMIR

 (Ends) .

Traction

A GZB/TKD WAP 7 or a TKD-based WAP-4 locomotive hauls the train for its entire journey  .

Operation

15651 Guwahati–Jammu Tawi Lohit Express runs from Guwahati every Monday reaching Jammu Tawi on the 3rd day .

15652 Jammu Tawi–Guwahati Lohit Express runs from Jammu Tawi every Wednesday reaching Guwahati on the 3rd day.

References 

 http://erail.in/15651-lohit-express
 http://www.dragtimes.com/video-viewer.php?v=bd_KjXJgro4&feature
 https://www.youtube.com/watch?v=MYxFLwHBo_M

External links

Named passenger trains of India
Rail transport in Assam
Rail transport in West Bengal
Rail transport in Bihar
Rail transport in Uttar Pradesh
Rail transport in Uttarakhand
Rail transport in Haryana
Rail transport in Punjab, India
Rail transport in Jammu and Kashmir
Transport in Guwahati
Transport in Jammu
Express trains in India